Amnicola limosus, common name the mud amnicola, is a species of very small aquatic snail, an operculate gastropod mollusk in the family Hydrobiidae.

Distribution
This species is distributed in the Northwest Atlantic Ocean and along the Gulf of Maine. Amnicola limosus limosus has been found in Utah.

The type locality is Delaware River and Schuylkill River.

Description

Parasites
Amnicola limosus is the first intermediate host for the trematode Metorchis conjunctus.

References

External links

Hydrobiidae
Molluscs of North America
Fauna of the Eastern United States
Fauna of the Great Lakes region (North America)
Gastropods described in 1817